Western Sydney Wanderers Football Club is an Australian professional association football club based in Rooty Hill, Sydney. The club was formed and admitted into the A-League Men in 2012.

The list encompasses the honours won by Western Sydney Wanderers, records set by the club, their managers and their players. The player records section itemises the club's leading goalscorers and those who have made most appearances in first-team competitions. It also records notable achievements by Western Sydney Wanderers players on the international stage. Attendance records at Parramatta Stadium, Stadium Australia and Western Sydney Stadium are also included.

Western Sydney Wanderers have won two top-flight titles and are the only Australian team to win the AFC Champions League. The club's record appearance maker is Mark Bridge, who made 141 appearances between 2012 and 2019. Brendon Santalab is the Western Sydney Wanderers' record goalscorer, scoring 41 goals in total.

All figures are correct as of the match played on 6 January 2023.

Honours and achievements

Domestic
 A-League Men Premiership
Winners (1): 2012–13
Runners-up (2): 2013–14, 2015–16

 A-League Men Championship
Runners-up (3): 2013, 2014, 2016

AFC
 AFC Champions League
Winners (1): 2014

Player records

Appearances
 Most A-League Men appearances: Mark Bridge, 121
 Most Australia Cup appearances: Kearyn Baccus, 12
 Most Asian appearances: Shannon Cole, 20
 Youngest first-team player: Alusine Fofanah, 15 years, 189 days (against Adelaide United, A-League, 19 January 2014)
 Oldest first-team player: Ante Covic, 39 years, 326 days (against Guangzhou Evergrande Taobao, AFC Champions League, 5 May 2015)
 Most consecutive appearances: Mitch Nichols, 52 (from 11 August 2015 to 28 January 2017)

Most appearances
Competitive matches only, includes appearances as substitute. Numbers in brackets indicate goals scored.

a. Includes goals and appearances (including those as a substitute) in the FIFA Club World Cup.

Goalscorers
 Most goals in a season: Brendon Santalab, 16 goals (in the 2016–17 season)
 Most league goals in a season: Oriol Riera, 15 goals in the A-League, 2017–18)
 Youngest goalscorer: Alexander Badolato, 16 years, 260 days (against Broadmeadow Magic, FFA Cup, 10 Noember 2021)
 Oldest goalscorer: Scott McDonald, 37 years, 253 days (against Sydney FC, A-League, 1 May 2021)

Top goalscorers
Competitive matches only. Numbers in brackets indicate appearances made.

a. Includes goals and appearances (including those as a substitute) in the FIFA Club World Cup.

International

This section refers to caps won while a Western Sydney Wanderers player.

 First capped player: Aaron Mooy for Australia against Guam on 7 December 2012
 Most capped player: Tomi Juric with 13 caps.
 First player to play in the World Cup finals: Matthew Spiranovic, for Australia against Chile on 13 June 2014

Managerial records

 First full-time manager: Tony Popovic managed the Western Sydney Wanderers from May 2012 to October 2017
 Longest-serving manager: Tony Popovic —  (17 May 2012 to 1 October 2017)
 Shortest tenure as manager: Hayden Foxe — 4 weeks, 1 day (3 October 2017 to 1 November 2017)
 Highest win percentage: Tony Popovic, 42.78%
 Lowest win percentage: Hayden Foxe, 16.67%

Club records

Matches

Firsts
 First match: Nepean 0–5 Western Sydney Wanderers, friendly, 25 July 2012
 First A-League Men match: Western Sydney Wanderers 0–0 Central Coast Mariners, 6 October 2012
 First Australia Cup match: Adelaide City 1–0 Western Sydney Wanderers, 12 August 2014
 First Asian match: Western Sydney Wanderers 1–3 Ulsan Hyundai, AFC Champions League group stage, 26 February 2014

Record wins
 Record A-League Men win: 
 6–1 against Adelaide United, A-League, 21 December 2012
 5–0 against Western United, A-League, 8 May 2021
 Record Australia Cup win: 7–1 against Sydney United 58, Round of 16, 28 August 2019
 Record Asian win: 5–0 against Guizhou Renhe, AFC Champions League group stage, 22 April 2014

Record defeats
 Record A-League Men defeat: 0–5 against Sydney FC, A-League, 9 December 2017
 Record Australia Cup defeat:
 1–4 against Melbourne City, Quarter-finals, 21 September 2016
 0–3 against Sydney FC, Semi-finals, 6 October 2018
 0–3 against Melbourne City, Quarter-finals, 18 September 2019
 Record Asian defeat: 1–6 against Urawa Red Diamonds, AFC Champions League group stage, 26 April 2017

Record consecutive results
 Record consecutive wins: 10, from 13 January 2013 to 16 March 2013
 Record consecutive defeats: 6, from 1 January 2019 to 22 January 2019
 Record consecutive matches without a defeat: 13, from 13 January 2013 to 12 April 2013
 Record consecutive matches without a win: 14, from 1 November 2014 to 1 February 2015.
 Record consecutive matches without conceding a goal: 4, from 12 March 2014 to 23 March 2014
 Record consecutive matches without scoring a goal: 3
 from 6 October 2012 to 20 October 2012
 from 26 November 2017 to 9 December 2017

Goals
 Most A-League Men goals scored in a season: 45 in 26 matches, 2020–21
 Fewest A-League Men goals scored in a season: 34 in 27 matches, 2013–14
 Most A-League Men goals conceded in a season: 54 in 27 matches, 2018–19
 Fewest A-League Men goals conceded in a season: 21 in 27 matches, 2012–13

Points
 Most points in a season: 57 in 27 matches: A-League, 2012–13
 Fewest points in a season: 18 in 27 matches: A-League, 2014–15

Attendances
This section applies to attendances at Parramatta Stadium, where Western Sydney Wanderers played their home matches from 2012 to 2016, Stadium Australia which acted as an alternative home and Western Sydney Stadium, the club's present ground are also included.

 Highest attendance at Parramatta Stadium: 20,084 against Brisbane Roar, A-League, 24 April 2016
 Lowest attendance at Parramatta Stadium: 5,221 against Kashima Antlers, AFC Champions League group stage, 21 April 2015
 Highest attendance at Stadium Australia: 61,880, against Sydney FC, A-League, 8 October 2016
 Lowest attendance at Stadium Australia: 7,062 against Melbourne Victory, A-League, 5 January 2019
 Highest attendance at Western Sydney Stadium: 28,519 against Sydney FC, A-League, 26 October 2019
 Lowest attendance at Western Sydney Stadium: 1,118 against Melbourne Victory, A-League, 12 August 2020

See also
 List of Western Sydney Wanderers FC seasons
 Western Sydney Wanderers FC league record by opponent

References

External links
 Official website

Australian soccer club statistics
Records and statistics
Sydney-sport-related lists